The Pakistan Mathematical Society (Acronym: PakMS), is a learned society for mathematical sciences, possibly the largest learned society of its own kind, and a research institute to promote mathematics in the country. The Pakistan Mathematical Society is an association of professional mathematicians dedicated to promote mathematical science and research and interest in the country. The organization annually published  various publications, and held conferences as well as annual monetary awards and prizes to mathematicians.

Foundation

On 15 May 2001, Mathematicians at Quaid-e-Azam University convened a moot at the Best Western Hotel in Islamabad. More than 70 professional mathematicians, post graduate and post doctoral mathematicians, gathered in the Attendance Hall of the Best Western Hotel. There, it was decided to establish a society catering for the needs of mathematical sciences and mathematicians in Pakistan.

On June 26 of 2001, Pakistan Mathematical Society was founded by Professor Dr Qaiser Mushtaq. At a function held at Allama Iqbal Open University, the constitution of the society was passed; officers and executive members were elected.

The PakMS was registered 16 November 2001. The Society had to apply again for registration under the ACT XXI of 1860 to meet the requirement of the Pakistan Science Foundation for registration of the society with it. It was registered under this Act on 17 February 2003.

Membership

In spite of the restricted memberships of the Pakistan Mathematical Society, the membership of the Society is open for any person who holds at least a master's degree in mathematics, irrespective of gender, race, creed, region or sect.

Administrative body
The governing body of the Society is the Executive Council. It includes five elected office bearers, namely, President, Vice-President, General Secretary, Treasurer, Information Secretary and five Executive Members. The Executive Council is elected in an annual general meeting at the end of every second year. As per constitutional requirement, it meets at least once every three months.

Publications

The PakMS publishes quarterly newsletter, known as PakMS Newsletter, a database of reviews of mathematical publications, various journals, and books. In March 2002, first issue was published. The Society published two issues in the first year and three issues in the second year. Afterwards, the society has been publishing four issues every year.

References

External links
Pakistan Mathematical Society
Algebra Forum

Mathematical societies
Learned societies of Pakistan